Henry Adonis Romero Velásquez (born 12 August 1996 in Tegucigalpa, Honduras) is a Honduran football player who currently plays as a forward for Marathón in the Liga Nacional de Fútbol Profesional de Honduras.

References

External links
 

1996 births
Living people
People from Tegucigalpa
Association football forwards
Honduran footballers
C.D. Marathón players
Liga Nacional de Fútbol Profesional de Honduras players